The Foreign Prince (German: Der fremde Fürst) is a 1918 German silent drama film directed by and starring Paul Wegener and also featuring Lyda Salmonova and Margarete Kupfer. It is now considered to be a lost film.

It was shot at the Tempelhof Studios in Berlin. The film's sets were designed by the art director Rochus Gliese.

Prior to its release, the film was censored for pornographic images in September 1918 as well as on 21 May 1921.

Cast
Paul Wegener as Hidde Yori, Son and heir of the island lord Prince Aswan
Lyda Salmonova as Eva, Brodersen's daughter 
Gustav Botz as Brodersen, merchant 
Rochus Gliese as Düssing, Evas Vetter, volunteer at Fa. Brodersen & Co. 
Margarete Kupfer as Frau Höhne, Zimmervermieterin 
Adolf E. Licho as variety director
Walter Norbert as Brodersen's servant
Paul Passarge as lawyer of Fa. Brodersen & Co. 
Hans Stürm as Schmitz, head of an overseas branch
 as Ein Kontorherr 
Elsa Wagner

References

External links

Films of the Weimar Republic
German silent feature films
Films directed by Paul Wegener
German drama films
1918 drama films
UFA GmbH films
Films shot at Tempelhof Studios
German black-and-white films
Lost German films
Silent drama films
1910s German films
1910s German-language films